Kim Soo-hee (born Kim Hee-soo in 13 March 1953) is a South Korean female singer.

Filmography

Television shows

Awards

References

External links
 

Trot singers
South Korean women singers
South Korean actresses
South Korean women film directors
South Korean women novelists
South Korean novelists
South Korean Roman Catholics
Musicians from Busan
1953 births
Living people